is a Japanese voice actor who was affiliated with Space Craft Entertainment but changed to Just Professional from 2016 to 2019. Ishii is the son of a Japanese father and Filipino mother. He is the former husband of voice actress Atsuko Enomoto. Ishii is best known for his role as Chrono Shindou in the Cardfight!! Vanguard G series and as Bellri Zenam in Gundam Reconguista in G.

On December 27, 2019, Just Production announced that it ended its contract with Ishii and that he has been diagnosed with a maladjustment and is in poor physical health. Ishii will take a hiatus from voice acting in order to improve his health.

On July 1, 2020, Ishii announced that he was returning to the voice acting industry after a 7-month hiatus, signing with the agency Aksent.

Early life and education
Ishii is of Japanese Filipino ethnicity. He lived in the Philippines for four years during his early childhood but returned to Japan for his school education. He was also a member of his junior high school tennis club. During his junior high school days he played a game called .hack//G.U. and became a fan of Takahiro Sakurai who inspired him to become a voice actor. After graduating from high school, Ishii went to the Tokyo Announcement Academy where he studied to become a voice actor.

Filmography

Anime

OVA

ONA

Video games

Dubbing roles

Personal life
On March 6, 2016, he announced his marriage to Atsuko Enomoto. Ishii stated that the reasons he and Enomoto agreed to get married include their shared interests and many commonalities. They divorced in 2018.

External links

References

1991 births
Living people
Japanese male video game actors
Japanese male voice actors
Japanese people of Filipino descent
Male voice actors from Chiba Prefecture
21st-century Japanese male actors